Boris Christoff (18 May 1914 – 28 June 1993) was a Bulgarian opera singer, widely considered one of the greatest basses of the 20th century.

Early life 
He was born in Plovdiv on 18 May 1914 to parents Kyryl Christov and Rayna Teodorova.  Boris Christoff demonstrated early his singing talent and sang as a boy at the choir of the Alexander Nevsky Cathedral, Sofia. His father had been a very popular cantor at Resen, attracting the faithful to the Bulgarian Exarchist church where he was chanting. 

In the late 1930s he graduated in law and started a career as a magistrate. He continued singing in his spare time in the Gusla Chorus in Sofia, achieving an enormous success as the chorus soloist in 1940. Thanks to a government grant, Christoff left in May 1942 for Italy where he was tutored for two years in the core Italian bass repertoire by the great baritone of an earlier generation, Riccardo Stracciari.

Performance career 

After several guest appearances and recitals in Austria in 1944 and 1945, Christoff returned to Italy in December 1945. He made his operatic debut as Colline in La bohème at Reggio Calabria on 12 March 1946. In following years Christoff appeared in a number of roles at Milan's La Scala, Venice's La Fenice, the Rome Opera, Covent Garden in London, the opera theatres in Naples, Barcelona, Lisbon, Rio de Janeiro, etc.

In 1950 he was invited to sing at the Metropolitan Opera in New York City but was refused entry into the USA as a result of the McCarran Immigration Act, which banned citizens of Eastern bloc countries from entering the country.  The role was instead filled by the young Italian basso, Cesare Siepi. After the restrictions were loosened, Christoff made an operatic debut in the United States in 1956 at the San Francisco Opera. He refused any further invitations to the Metropolitan and never appeared there. After a brief absence from the scene due to brain tumour surgery in 1964, Christoff resumed his career in 1965, though at a much slower pace. In 1967 he was allowed to return to Bulgaria for the first time since 1945, for the funeral of his mother.

In the 1970s Christoff on-stage performances became more infrequent. He brought his career to an end with a final concert at the Accademia di Bulgaria in Rome on 22 June 1986. He died in Rome in 1993 and his body was returned to Bulgaria,   lay in repose in  Alexander Nevsky Cathedral in Sofia and later was buried in section 46 of Sofia Central Cemetery.

Voice, repertoire, character 

Christoff had an excellent voice with a distinctive dark tone.  Although it was not as large as some other bass voices, he had no trouble making an impact in big spaces like the San Francisco Opera. Owing to his stage presence and dramatic temperament, he was a worthy heir to the grand tradition of Slavonic basses exemplified by Fyodor Stravinsky, Lev Sibiriakov, Vladimir Kastorsky, Feodor Chaliapin, Alexander Kipnis and Mark Reizen, among others. He sang mostly in Verdi and the Russian repertoire, and was also a refined performer of vocal chamber music. Among his most famous roles were those of Tsar Boris (Mussorgsky - Boris Godunov), Philip II (Verdi - Don Carlo), Mephistopheles (Gounod - Faust and Boito - Mefistofele), Ivan Susanin (Glinka - A Life for the Tsar), Zaccaria (Verdi - Nabucco), Tsar Ivan (Rimsky-Korsakov - Ivan the Terrible), Dosifei (Mussorgsky - Khovanshchina), Gomez da Silva (Verdi - Ernani), Fiesco (Verdi - Simon Boccanegra), Attila (Verdi - Attila), Padre Guardiano (Verdi - La forza del destino), Galitzky and Kontchak (Borodin - Prince Igor) and others.

Christoff made studio recordings of eight operas (Don Carlo, Boris Godunov and Faust twice each) and numerous live recordings (radio or stage performances). He was much admired as song singer and he recorded more than 200 Russian songs by Mussorgsky (he was the first to record all his 63 songs), Tchaikovsky, Rimsky-Korsakov, Glinka, Borodin, Cui, Balakirev as well as traditional songs, mostly with piano accompaniment.  He initiated the tradition of making studio recordings of Boris Godunov with the same basso singing three roles (Boris, Varlaam, Pimen).

While he was a grand performer on stage, Christoff had difficult off-stage relations with fellow singers and producers, which sometimes grew into public scandals. In 1955 he fell out with Maria Callas during the performances of Medea at the Rome Opera and in 1961 his contract with La Scala was terminated after an open conflict with fellow Bulgarian Nicolai Ghiaurov whom Christoff blamed for collaborating with the Bulgarian communist regime.  Herbert von Karajan tried to make him sing the title role in Don Giovanni which would have been inappropriate for his range; this prompted him to sever relations with von Karajan.

He was the brother-in-law of the Italian baritone Tito Gobbi.

Recordings

Many recordings are available. The following list contains just a few.

 His complete songs by Mussorgsky are available, produced by EMI.
 He recorded the Verdi Requiem 3 times, once under Tullio Serafin in Rome 1959, once with Herbert von Karajan and once with Bruno Bartoletti.
 Two recordings of Boris Godunov are available with Christoff singing three roles: Boris, Pimen, and Father Varlaam.
 Two performances in major Wagner roles are available, both sung in Italian:  Gurnemanz in Parsifal conducted in Rome 1950 by Vittorio Gui, and Pogner the goldsmith in Die Meistersinger von Nürnberg, conducted (studio) by Lovro von Matačić in Torino 1962.
 Lugano Recital 1976 [DVD]

Awards
 Sonning Award (1969; Denmark)

Honors 

 A rocky cliff forming Aytos Point on the coast of Bransfield Strait, eastern Livingston Island, Antarctica is named after him.

Notes

External links
 
 Museum Boris Christoff (Sofia, Bulgaria)
 Borischristoff.dir.bg
 Discography of opera recordings (Capon's Lists of Opera Recordings)
 http://www.boris-christoff.net
 Boris Christoff - Life and Creative Work (Film of Ludmil Trifonov)
 The Voice That Prays for Bulgaria (Film of BNT on 100 Years From His Birth)
  His page on the Stars of Bulgarian Opera site with mp3 audio clips of selected arias
 BBC Radio 4 - Desert Island Discs, Boris Christoff, 21 August 1979
 
 "The Song of the Volga Boatman" (YouTube)
 Gounod aria from FAUST (YouTube)
 
 

1914 births
1993 deaths
Operatic basses
20th-century Bulgarian male opera singers
Bulgarian emigrants to Italy
Sofia University alumni
Musicians from Plovdiv
Recipients of the Léonie Sonning Music Prize